Acer spicatum, the mountain maple, dwarf maple, moose maple, or white maple, is a species of maple native to northeastern North America from Saskatchewan to Newfoundland, and south to Pennsylvania. It also grows at high elevations in the southern Appalachian Mountains to northern Georgia.

Description
They are coarsely and irregularly toothed with a light green hairless surface and a finely hairy underside. The leaves turn brilliant yellow to red in autumn, and are on slender stalks usually longer than the blade. The bark is thin, dull gray-brown, and smooth at first but becoming slightly scaly.

Distribution and ecology
The tree lives in moist woods in rich, well-drained soils on rocky hillsides and along streams. It also grows on ravines, cliff faces, and forested bogs. It colonizes the understory of hardwood forests.

Mammals such as moose, deer, beavers, and rabbits browse the bark; ruffed grouse eat the buds.

Uses
The sap is a source of sugar and can be boiled to make maple syrup. The bark contains tannins, which are used in tanning leather. Indigenous peoples infused the piths of young twigs to produce treatments for eye irritation and made poultices from boiled root chips. It is also said to be used to relieve stress in humans. The wood has been a popular choice for making musical instruments because of its high strength and durability.

References

External links
Common Shrub Species of the Northwest Forest, Acer spicatum Mountain Maple, White Maple
Acer spicatum images from Vanderbilt University
Portrait of the Earth, Winter ID pictures
Interactive Distribution Map of Acer spicatum
 

spicatum
Plants described in 1786
Trees of Western Canada
Trees of Eastern Canada
Trees of the North-Central United States
Trees of the Northeastern United States
Trees of the Southeastern United States
Flora of the Appalachian Mountains
Flora of the Great Lakes region (North America)
Taxa named by Jean-Baptiste Lamarck